Nahuel Pérez Biscayart (born 6 March 1986) is an Argentine actor. A polyglot, he is best known for his role in the French film BPM (Beats per Minute) (2017), which earned him a César and a Lumières Award.

Early life
Pérez Biscayart was born in Buenos Aires to a mother of Basque and Italian descent and a father of Spanish-Andalusian descent. His grandmother is from Biarritz. He trained at the Buenos Aires School of Fine Arts.

Filmography

Film

Television

Theatre

References

External links

 

1986 births
Living people
People from Buenos Aires
21st-century Argentine male actors
Argentine male film actors
Argentine male television actors
Argentine people of Basque descent
Argentine people of Italian descent
Most Promising Actor César Award winners
People of Andalusian descent
IFFI Best Actor (Male) winners